SL Records was a record label based in Edinburgh, Scotland. It was founded in 1997 and is known for releasing anti-folk, alternative rock, and indie pop albums. The label's first release was the compilation album It's a Life Sentence, which was released in May 1997. The album compiled tracks by different artists who had performed live on a radio show co-hosted by Ed Pybus, who later became the label's founder, along with his flatmate Merlin Kemp. Pybus started the label soon after graduating from university; "SL" in the label's name stands for "student loans". The label came to greater attention after its first single, Khaya's "Summer/Winter Song," was played on air by multiple British radio hosts, including John Peel.

Notable artists
Notable current or former SL Records artists include the following:
Ballboy
Dawn of the Replicants
Misty's Big Adventure
Saint Jude’s Infirmary
Withered Hand

References

Record labels established in 1997
Scottish record labels
1997 establishments in Scotland
Companies based in Edinburgh